Emyr Wyn Rowlands (b February 1942) is a Church in Wales priest: he was Archdeacon of Merioneth from 2004 2010.

Jones was educated at St. Michael's College, Llandaff and the Church of Ireland Theological Institute. After a curacy at Holyhead he was the Incumbent at Bodedern from 1974 to 1988; and at Machynlleth from 1988 to 2010.

References

1942 births
Living people
Archdeacons of Merioneth
Alumni of St Michael's College, Llandaff
Alumni of the Church of Ireland Theological Institute